A lame duck, in the context of a game, is a player who remains in the game but has no chance of winning. It must be literally impossible – not merely highly improbable – for a player to win for it to constitute a lame-duck scenario.

Lame ducks are often found in sport. The teams that are eliminated from playoff contention are lame ducks, and have nothing remaining to play for, often with several weeks of games remaining on the schedule. In some cases, losing the remaining games can be more favorable than attempting to win them, due to more favorable positioning in a draft and the ability to land more talented players. Teams in Europe (especially those without drafts) discourage "losing out" by imposing a relegation system that expels the lowest teams from the league. A draft lottery is used in some North American professional leagues to discourage losing out by randomizing who gets the top draft picks, while still assuring the less talented teams have access to the players necessary to compete. (See: elimination from possibility of reaching postseason)

A  kingmaker is a lame duck who retains the ability to influence (sometimes decisively) who, among other players, will win the game. In sports, the spoiler plays a similar role.

Game design